Te sigo amando (English: I still love you) is a Mexican telenovela produced by Carla Estrada for Televisa in 1996. The script was written by Delia Fiallo. It was an adaptation of Delia Fiallo's original radio novela La Mujer Que No Podia Amar, and was a remake of the 1986 telenovela Monte calvario.

The series stars Claudia Ramírez, Luis José Santander, Sergio Goyri and Olivia Collins.

History
Te sigo amando is the second adaptation of Delia Fiallo's original radio novela La Mujer Que No Podia Amar, the first being Monte calvario in 1986. This telenovela was later remade and updated in 2011 as La que no podia amar.

From Monday, November 18, 1996 to Friday, May 2, 1997, Canal de las Estrellas aired Te sigo amando, replacing La antorcha encendida, with La jaula de oro replacing it.

From Monday March 31, 1997 to Thursday, August 14, 1997, Univisión aired Te sigo amando weeknights at 8pm/7c, replacing María la del Barrio. The last episode was broadcast on Thursday, August 14, 1997 at 8pm/7c, with El alma no tiene color replacing it the following Monday. From Monday, March 30, 1998 to Wedsnesday, June 3, 1998, Galavisión aired 2 hour broadcast of Te sigo amando weekday afternoons at 2pm/1c, replacing María la del Barrio. The last episode was broadcast on June 3, 1998 at 2pm/1c, with Acapulco, cuerpo y alma replacing it. From Tuesday, July 18, 2000 to Saturday, December 2, 2000, Univision broadcast reruns of Te sigo amando every Tuesday mornings to Saturday mornings at 1am/12c, replacing Cañaveral de Pasiones. The last episode was broadcast on Saturday, December 2, 2000 at 1am/12c, with Marimar replacing it.

Plot
Yulissa Torres-Quintero is a young woman, married to Ignacio Aguirre, a powerful man whom the people fear but who cannot walk due to an accident. They live on a farm called Arroyo Negro. Yulissa lives tormented in her marriage and escapes to Puerto Escondido, where she meets Luis Angel Zaldivar, a renowned and famous doctor. The two fall deeply in love but Yulissa hides several things from Luis Angel, posing as Marina. Yulissa gives herself to Luis Angel. Later, after being threatened by Ignacio, she decides to return. Luis Angel stays and with a broken heart.

Then one day when Ignacio, Yulissa and Leticia, Ignacio's sister were watching television, Luis Angel came out, talking about Yulissa by the name of Marina. Leticia falls in love with the doctor and Ignacio thinks that Luis Angel can cure him, and invites him to Arroyo Negro. Luis Angel discovers Yulissa's lie but forgives her. They continue to see each other in secret. Ignacio is operated on and follows a scam to heal. But a series of misunderstandings cause Yulissa and Luis Angel to separate. Luis Angel makes love with Leticia.

Leticia finds out that she is pregnant, around the same time that Yulissa finds out that she is also pregnant but Leticia loses the baby. Ignacio wants revenge for Yulissa's lie and he and Leticia plan to take the baby from Yulissa when she is born.

One night, Yulissa's baby is born. It's a baby boy. Leticia takes him with her and passes him off as her son. Ignacio tells Yulissa that her baby died and she does not accept it and insists that her son is still alive. Soon, the baby gets sick because of the milk and the nanny takes him to the hospital after having gastrointestinal problems. The nanny then tells Luis Angel he's the father of the baby boy and that Leticia is the mother. Some DNA tests are run and Luis Angel is confirmed as the father of the boy. Yulissa runs away from Arroyo Negro again, depressed from the loss of her son.

Luis Angel married Leticia. Slowly, Yulissa starts discovering the truth and tells Luis Angel. Leticia is jailed for kidnapping a child. Ignacio, who is already healed, takes the boy. Luis Angel and Yulissa go to Arroyo Negro to get their son back, but Ignacio refuses to give him back threatening to kill him. He tries to run off with the boy but he gets shot and Luis Angel and Yulissa get their son back, whose name is Luis Angel. Jr. Ignacio dies

Yulissa and Luis Angel each go separate ways, with Yulissa taking Luis Angel. Jr

Cast
 
 Claudia Ramírez as Yulissa
 Luis José Santander as Dr. Luis Angel
 Sergio Goyri as Ignacio
 Olivia Collins as Leticia
 Carmen Montejo† as Doña Paula
 Katy Jurado† as Justina  
 María Rojo as Felipa
 Magda Guzmán† as Doña Ofelia
 Guillermo Murray† as Arturo
 René Muñoz† as Father Murillo
 Juan Manuel Bernal as Alberto
 Mónica Prado as Estela
 Aurora Clavel as Tránsito
 Harry Geithner as Lencho
 Osvaldo Benavides as Lazarito 
 Alejandra Procuna as Elisa 
 Arturo Lorca as Chucho
 Andrés Gutiérrez as Danilo
 Lorena Enríquez as Consuelito
 Yadhira Carrillo as Teresa
 Héctor Parra as Enrique
 Nerina Ferrer as Martina
 Alejandro Rábago as Fidencio
 María Clara Zurita as Marina
 Tito Reséndiz as Octavio

Awards and nominations

References

External links

1996 telenovelas
Mexican telenovelas
1996 Mexican television series debuts
1997 Mexican television series endings
Spanish-language telenovelas
Television shows set in Mexico
Televisa telenovelas